North Scituate is a village in the town of Scituate, Rhode Island. Since 1967, the village has been home to the Scituate Art Festival.

Much of the community is included in a historic district on the Danielson Pike and West Greenville Road.  The district contains many nineteenth-century buildings, including the Old Congregational Church (1834) and Smithville Seminary (1839). The district was added to the National Register of Historic Places in 1979.

The zip code for the village is 02857. The zip code is assigned to the name "North Scituate". The zip code extends not only into Scituate but also Glocester, Rhode Island to the north.

See also

National Register of Historic Places listings in Providence County, Rhode Island
Seagrave Memorial Observatory

References

Historic districts in Providence County, Rhode Island
Eastern Nazarene College locations
Villages in Providence County, Rhode Island
 
Scituate, Rhode Island
Providence metropolitan area
Villages in Rhode Island
Historic districts on the National Register of Historic Places in Rhode Island
National Register of Historic Places in Providence County, Rhode Island